The politics of Michigan, a competitive state that leans Democratic in presidential elections, are divided. Michigan is considered part of the Democrats' "Blue Wall." Governors since the 1970s have alternated between the two parties, and statewide offices including attorney general, secretary of state, and senator have been held by members of both parties in varying proportions, though the state currently is represented by two Democratic U.S. Senators and Democrats hold every statewide office. The Democratic Party holds a slim majority in both the House and Senate of the Michigan Legislature, by two seats in each. The state's congressional delegation is commonly split, with one party or the other typically holding a narrow majority, and Democrats currently have a 7-6 majority.

The state has historically been a bellwether having voted for the national winner all but six times since 1920, with the exceptions of 1940, 1948, 1968, 1976, 2000, and 2004. It currently has the longest active bellwether streak, tied with Wisconsin and Pennsylvania, going back to the 2008 election. Prior to being a swing state, it was a Republican stronghold, voting Republican all but once from 1856 to 1928, with the lone expectation being a Progressive victory in 1912.

Republican strongholds of the state include the rural areas in Western and Northern Michigan, the Upper Peninsula, Livingston County, and (historically) the outer suburbs of Grand Rapids, although redistricting after the 2020 census and shifting demographics has led many political observers to call the Grand Rapids suburbs a "toss-up" in future elections. Areas of Democratic strength include the cities of Detroit, Ann Arbor, Lansing, Flint, Kalamazoo, Grand Rapids, and Muskegon, as well as many of those cities' inner ring suburbs. Much of suburban Detroit—which includes parts of Oakland, Macomb, and Wayne counties—is politically competitive between the two parties.

History

Historically, the first county-level meeting of the Republican Party took place in Jackson on July 6, 1854, and the party thereafter dominated Michigan until the Great Depression. In the 1912 election, Michigan was one of the six states to support progressive Republican and third-party candidate Theodore Roosevelt for president after he lost the Republican nomination to William Howard Taft.

Michigan remained fairly reliably Republican at the presidential level for much of the 20th century. It was part of Greater New England, the northern tier of states settled chiefly by migrants from New England who carried their culture with them. The state was one of only a handful to back Wendell Willkie over Franklin Roosevelt in 1940, and supported Thomas E. Dewey in his losing bid against Harry S. Truman in 1948. 

Michigan went to the Democrats in two presidential elections during the 1960s but voted for the Republican candidate in every election from 1972 to 1988, including "native son" Gerald Ford in 1976. Since 1992 it has supported the Democrats by moderate margins, except for a narrow win by Donald Trump in 2016, which was the closet election in the state's history. In 2020, Joe Biden won it back by 2.8 points.

Michigan was the home of Gerald Ford, the 38th president of the United States. Born in Nebraska, he moved as an infant to Grand Rapids. The Gerald R. Ford Museum is in Grand Rapids, and the Gerald R. Ford Presidential Library is on the campus of his alma mater, the University of Michigan in Ann Arbor.

Michigan's United States Senator Thomas W. Ferry, was President pro tempore of the United States Senate from March 9, 1875 – March 17, 1879. Vice President Henry Wilson died on November 22, 1875. Ferry, being President pro tempore of the Senate, was next in the line of presidential succession, and remained so until March 4, 1877. While the title "Acting Vice President" isn't defined in the Constitution, the title was widely used at the time (including by Ferry himself).

In 1846, Michigan became the first state in the Union, as well as the first government in the world, to abolish the death penalty. Historian David Chardavoyne has suggested the movement to abolish capital punishment in Michigan grew out of enmity toward Canada, which made public executions a regular practice under British rule.

2020 election 

While Michigan remained competitive in 2020, Democratic nominee Joe Biden's strength with traditional Democratic constituencies such as Black voters (93% to Trump's 6%) and organized labor (56% to Trump's 42%) and increased voter turnout in Detroit and its wealthy suburbs helped tip the state in his favor.

Ballot Initiatives 
Michigan approved plans to expand Medicaid coverage in 2014 to adults with incomes up to 133% of the federal poverty level (approximately $15,500 for a single adult in 2014).

In 2018, the state electorate passed proposals to create an independent redistricting commission, and to legalize the recreational use of marijuana.

In 2020, voters approved two ballot measures, one to increase the limit of money from sales of gas and oil from state-owned land that can benefit state parks, and another to require a warrant for search or seizure of electronic data and communications.

Michigan's Federal Representation

Following each decennial census, the Michigan Redistricting Commission forms to realign the districts. Michigan currently has 13 House districts In the 118th Congress, 7 of New Jersey's seats are held by Democrats and 6 are held by Republicans. There are as follows:

Michigan's 1st congressional district represented by Jack Bergman (R)
Michigan's 2nd congressional district represented by John Moolenaar (R)
Michigan's 3rd congressional district represented by Hillary Scholten (D)
Michigan's 4th congressional district represented by Bill Huizenga (R)
Michigan's 5th congressional district represented by Tim Walberg (R)
Michigan's 6th congressional district represented by Debbie Dingell (D)
Michigan's 7th congressional district represented by Elissa Slotkin (D)
Michigan's 8th congressional district represented by Dan Kildee (D)
Michigan's 9th congressional district represented by Lisa McClain (R)
Michigan's 10th congressional district represented by John James (R)
Michigan's 11th congressional district represented by Haley Stevens (D)
Michigan's 12th congressional district represented by Rashida Tlaib (D)
Michigan's 13th congressional district represented by Shri Thanedar (D)

Michigan's two United States Senators are Democrats Debbie Stabenow and Gary Peters, serving since 2001 and 2015, respectively. 

Michigan is part of the United States District Court for the Western District of Michigan and the United States District Court for the Eastern District of Michigan in the federal judiciary. The district's cases are appealed to the Cincinnati-based United States Court of Appeals for the Sixth Circuit.

References